Sugar tree may refer to:

Acer saccharum, a maple commonly known as the sugar tree
Sugartree, Missouri, an unincorporated community
Sugar Tree, Tennessee, an unincorporated community in the United States
Sugartree, an album by Jill Johnson

See also

 
 
 
 
 
 Sugar Bush (disambiguation)